The Neumann  is a large-diaphragm condenser microphone. It is one of the most famous studio microphones and was Neumann's first microphone after the Second World War. Units produced before 1950 were distributed by Telefunken and bear the Telefunken logo.

The Neumann  is regarded as one of several all-time preferred tube recording microphones ("The Big Five"). Its desirability is based primarily on the synergy of its three sound-shaping components: capsule, tube, transformer. The U47 was especially popular in US studios. Frank Sinatra owned his own ; Ella Fitzgerald, Louis Armstrong, Bing Crosby, Tony Bennett and the Beatles also used it. According to the microphone manufacturer John Peluso, "it's hard to find an album recorded in the 1950s or 1960s that didn't have a U47 on it; the Beatles used the mike for almost every track they sang from 1962 through 1970".

History

Original series 

The original  used the  capsule, which was similar to the capsule developed initially for the Neumann  microphone designed in the late 1920s ("Neumann bottle").

The 's circuitry was based on the Telefunken  vacuum tube (the suffix "M" indicates a low noise valve, suitable for use in microphones) and the GN8/BV8 transformer; for export to the American market, the GN8 transformer was replaced in the late 1950s with the GN8b which featured lower output. According to the German expert Andreas Grosser, at least five different output transformers were used within the U 47. 

Beginning in 1962, Neumann offered a direct plug-in replacement kit ("") for the  featuring the Nuvistor , which required minor power supply modification. 

The original  was the first switchable pattern condenser microphone (cardioid or  omnidirectional). This functionality was achieved by disabling the polarization voltage to the rear of the diaphragm of the microphone capsule.

Successors: ,  and  

The , introduced by Neumann late 1957, was identical to the  except for the available polar patterns (cardioid and  figure of eight instead of cardioid and omnidirectional). The Beatles' producer George Martin used the  extensively in the group's recordings at Abbey Road Studios, London.

The , the solid-state version introduced by Neumann in 1969, was less appreciated as a vocal microphone but became ubiquitous in studios as a bass drum microphone. Used on the outside of the bass drum, in conjunction with a primary bass drum microphone (which would usually be placed on the inside, or close to the inside of a bass drum or a bass drum head), it would make a complete bass drum sound.

References

External links
Official website: U 47 and U 47 FET
Detailed photos and schematic

U47